Murat Selvi (born 10 July 1982) is a Belgian former professional footballer of Turkish descent who played as a defender.

References

1982 births
Living people
Belgian footballers
Turkish footballers
K.F.C. Dessel Sport players
K. Patro Eisden Maasmechelen players
Hacettepe S.K. footballers
Kardemir Karabükspor footballers
Elazığspor footballers
People from Maasmechelen
Association football defenders
Footballers from Limburg (Belgium)
Süper Lig players
TFF First League players
TFF Second League players
Challenger Pro League players